José Ignacio Pérez Frías (27 April 1955 – 30 March 2018), sometimes known as just Nacho, was a Spanish footballer who played as a defender.

He spent his entire professional career with Málaga, playing 223 competitive matches while appearing in four La Liga seasons.

Early life
Born in Madrid to hotel employee Pedro Pérez and his wife Isabel Frías, Nacho and his ten siblings (eventually the couple fathered 12 children) moved with the family to Málaga at the age of 14.

He started playing football with Puerto Malagueño and Real Madrid Castilla, but suffered an injury while at the service of the latter club and was released shortly after signing.

Club career
Nacho subsequently joined Atlético Malagueño, whilst studying for his medical degree. He made his debut with the first team of Málaga CF on 10 November 1976, coming on as a late substitute in a 3–0 home win against Linares CF in the Copa del Rey. His maiden appearance in La Liga came the following 6 March, also coming from the bench in a 1–3 away loss to Real Zaragoza, and he scored his first in the competition on 26 March of the same year but in another away defeat (2–1, at RC Celta de Vigo).

In 1979, Nacho was appointed team captain. He won two promotions to the top division with his main club, in that year and also in 1982.

Nacho retired in 1991 at the age of 36, after spells in the lower leagues with Real Avilés, CA Marbella and CD Mijas. Later, he worked with Málaga as a youth coach and doctor.

International career
Nacho won three caps for Spain at under-18 level.

Personal life and death
Nacho's brother and son, respectively Juan Carlos and Ignacio, were also footballers. They too played for Málaga.

Nacho died on 30 March 2018, at the age of 62. He was recovering in his Málaga home from severe burns, from which he was tended at the Hospital Regional Universitario Carlos Haya.

References

External links

Stats at Amigos Malaguistas 

1955 births
2018 deaths
Footballers from Madrid
Spanish footballers
Association football defenders
La Liga players
Segunda División players
Segunda División B players
Tercera División players
Real Madrid Castilla footballers
Atlético Malagueño players
CD Málaga footballers
Real Avilés CF footballers
CA Marbella footballers
Spain youth international footballers
Spanish sports physicians
Málaga CF non-playing staff